Maturango Peak is the highest mountain in the Argus Range. The area is under the control of the Naval Air Weapons Station China Lake  and access is restricted.

Origin of the name
The name “Maturango” first appeared in 1877 on the Wheeler Survey Map. It may be derived from the Spanish word “maturrango” (an appellation used in Buenos Aires for a European, meaning a bad horseman or a bad horse), or it may be derived from the name Malarango, a chief of the Coso people.

References

Mountains of Inyo County, California
Mountains of Northern California